Buscando a Frida (English title: The Search for Frida) is an American drama television series that aired on Telemundo from 26 January 2021 to 24 May 2021. The series is an adaptation of the 
Chilean telenovela titled ¿Dónde está Elisa? created by Pablo Illanes, which Telemundo had adapted in 2010 with the same name. It stars Eduardo Santamarina, Ximena Herrera, and Arap Bethke.

Plot 
The series revolves around the Pons family and how their lives suddenly changed when their daughter, Frida, mysteriously disappears on the night of her father's birthday party. During the investigation lies, resentments, and secrets will come out, turning everyone into suspects and unmasking a family that is far from perfect.

Cast 
An extensive cast list was published on 30 September 2020 in a press release.

Main
 Eduardo Santamarina as Abelardo Pons
 Ximena Herrera as Marcela Bribiesca
 Arap Bethke as Martín Cabrera
 Alejandra Barros as Rafaela Pons
 Rubén Zamora as Salvador Terán
 Fabiola Guajardo as Silvia Cantú
 Jorge Luis Moreno as Ángel Olvera
 Grettell Valdez as Gabriela Pons
 Alberto Casanova as Antonio Carmona
 Gloria Peralta as Fiscal Julieta Zambrano
 Karla Carrillo as Sasha Caballero
 Germán Bracco as Diego Carmona
 Jorge Luis Vázquez as Enrique Arteaga
 Axel Arenas as Detective Robles
 Mayra Sierra as Amanda
 Victoria White as Frida Pons Bribiesca

Recurring 
 Ximena Martínez as Ingrid Terán
 Mikel Mateos as Tomas Terán
 Tamara Guzmán as Rosita
 Ivanna Castro as Carolina Pons Bribiesca
 Valery Sais as Laura Pons Bribiesca
 Roberto Ballesteros as Fabio Pedroza

Episodes

Production 
Buscando a Frida began filming during the COVID-19 pandemic on 26 August 2020, concluding after several months on 23 December 2020. Executive producer Marcos Santana said that the point of the series was to incorporate "social media" into an eleven-year-old story.

Reception

Ratings 
   
}}

Awards and nominations

References

External links 
 

2021 telenovelas
2021 American television series debuts
2021 American television series endings
Spanish-language American telenovelas
Spanish-language telenovelas
American telenovelas
Telemundo telenovelas
Telemundo original programming
2020s American LGBT-related drama television series